Roanoke is an unincorporated community in southern  Lewis County, West Virginia, United States. Most of the original town is located under  of Stonewall Jackson Lake's water. A display at the Stonewall Resort State Park's lodge tells the story of the flood-plagued town that was purchased in the 1980s by the United States Army Corps of Engineers. The flood control dam at Stonewall Jackson Lake went into service in 1988. According to the U.S. Geological Survey, Roanoke has also been known as "Bush Mills", "Bushs Mills", "Roanville", and "Roanville Station".

The community was named after Roanoke, Virginia.

References

External links

Unincorporated communities in Lewis County, West Virginia
Unincorporated communities in West Virginia
Historic American Buildings Survey in West Virginia